2017 saw the release of numerous video games as well as other developments in the video game industry. The Nintendo Switch console was released in 2017, which sold more than 14 million units by the end of 2017, exceeding the underperforming Wii U lifetime sales, and helped to revitalize Nintendo, alongside the "retro" Super NES Classic Edition console, the refreshed New Nintendo 2DS XL handheld, and a strategy for mobile gaming. Microsoft also released the higher-powered Xbox One X targeted for 4K resolutions and virtual reality support.

Top-rated games in 2017 included The Legend of Zelda: Breath of the Wild, Super Mario Odyssey, Persona 5, Divinity: Original Sin II, and Horizon Zero Dawn. One of the most influential games of 2017 was PlayerUnknown's Battlegrounds, which was released in early access for personal computers in March 2017 and by the end of the year had sold 30million units, breaking several concurrent player count records and established the battle royale genre. The highest-grossing game of the year was the mobile game Honor of Kings, known as Arena of Valor internationally. Considerable debate was held over the use of loot boxes in video games and whether they constituted gambling, coming to a head with the release of Star Wars Battlefront II.

Top-rated games

Major awards

Critically acclaimed games
Metacritic is an aggregator of video game journalism reviews. It generally considers expansions and re-releases as separate entities.

Financial performance
According to analyst firm Newzoo, the video game industry had  in global revenues, a 10% growth from 2016. This growth was primarily driven by mobile gaming, as 43% of those revenues came from this sector, a growth of 23.3% from 2016. Of the remaining, 29% came from consoles hardware and games, and 28% from personal computer games.

Further,  was spent on mobile gaming in 2017 in the United States, according to Sensor Tower.

Highest-grossing games
The following were 2017's top ten highest-grossing video games in terms of worldwide revenue (including physical sales, digital purchases, microtransactions, free-to-play and pay-to-play) across all platforms (including mobile, PC and console platforms). Six of the top ten highest-grossing games are published or owned by Tencent, including the top three titles.

Highest-grossing free-to-play games
The following were the top ten highest-grossing free-to-play games in 2017. Six of the top ten titles were published or owned by Tencent, including the top three titles.

Sensor Tower reported that the highest-grossing mobile games were the free-to-play titles Monster Strike, Honor of Kings, Fate/Grand Order, Clash Royale, and Candy Crush Saga.  The top-grossing mobile games in the United States were Candy Crush Saga, Game of War: Fire Age, Clash of Clans, Mobile Strike, and Clash Royale.

Best-selling premium games 
The following were the top ten best-selling premium games (including buy-to-play titles) in 2017. Four of the top ten titles were published by Nintendo.

Best-selling games by country
The following were 2017's top ten best-selling video games by country, in terms of software units sold (excluding microtransactions and free-to-play titles) on PC and console platforms, for the United States, Japan, and United Kingdom.

Events

Notable deaths

 June 9 – Adam West, 88, voice actor best known for the voice of Mayor Adam West in the "Family Guy" franchise.
 July 26 – June Foray, 99, voice actress best known for the voice of villainess Magica De Spell in the original "Ducktales" series, as well as the 2013 video game "DuckTales: Remastered", which is a remaster of the original 1989 video game.

Hardware releases
The list of game-related hardware released in 2017 in North America.

Game releases

Series with new entries
Series with new installments in 2017 include Assassin's Creed, Bomberman, Bubsy, Call of Duty, Crash Bandicoot, Danganronpa, Dawn of War, Destiny, Digimon, Dragon Quest, Doom, Dynasty Warriors, Final Fantasy, Fire Emblem, Forza Motorsport, Gran Turismo, Gravity Rush, Halo Wars, Injustice, Kingdom Hearts, Life Is Strange, Marvel vs. Capcom, Mass Effect, Metroid, Need for Speed, Nier, Persona, Planescape: Torment, Pokémon, Prey, Professor Layton, Resident Evil, Sniper Elite, Sniper: Ghost Warrior, Sonic the Hedgehog, Splatoon, Star Wars Battlefront, Super Mario, Tekken, The Evil Within, The Legend of Zelda, Tom Clancy's Ghost Recon, Uncharted, Wipeout, Wolfenstein, WWE 2K,  Xenoblade Chronicles, Yakuza and Yoshi.

In addition, 2017 saw the introduction of several new properties, including Cuphead, Doki Doki Literature Club!, ELEX, Fortnite, Hellblade, Hollow Knight, Horizon, Nioh, and PlayerUnknown's Battlegrounds.

January–March

April–June

July–September

October–December

Video game-based film and television releases

Cancelled games

Cancelled
 Bloodstained: Ritual of the Night (WiiU)
 Scalebound (Win, XBO)
 Titanfall: Frontline (iOS, Droid)
 MetaWorld (VR)

Unavailable
 Club Penguin
 Firefall
 The Tomorrow Children
 Marvel Heroes

See also
2017 in games

References

Notes
 The release date is slated for Japan only.
 A western or worldwide release of previously regional exclusive games.

Footnotes

 
Video games by year
2017-related lists